Mesquita Brasil (Mosque Brazil) is a mosque located in Cambuci, central district of São Paulo city, Brazil. It was first founded in 1929 by the Muslim Beneficent Society of São Paulo. Mesquita Brasil is the oldest mosque in Brazil and one of the oldest mosques in South America.

History
History of Mesquita Brasil dates back to the 1920s. In the aftermath of the World War I, many Muslim immigrants began arriving in São Paulo after fleeing troubles in the Middle East region. In 1927, Palestinian Muslim Charitable Society was formed by some Palestinian immigrants including Darwich Gazal and Hosni Adura. As more immigrants arrived from Syria and Lebanon, they changed the name of the society to Muslim Beneficent Society (SBM) in 1929. The Mesquita Brasil began in 1929 with the formation of the Muslim Beneficent Society (SBM) of São Paulo.

The Muslim Beneficent Society (SBM) first began holding congregation prayers in rented rooms in Av Rangel Pestana and Barão de Duprat in São Paulo. In 1938, they acquired a land and shifted prayers to the Avenue of the State.

In 1940, the society moved permanently to the present premises of the Mesquita Brasil in Av. Do Estado, 5,382, Cambuci, São Paulo and began construction of the first Brazilian mosque. Construction took many years and the mosque was officially inaugurated in 1960. The inauguration was attended by Arab and Brazilian officials, including H.E. Hussein Zulfaqqar Sabry, Deputy Foreign Minister of the United Arab Republic, representing the Secretary-General of the Organization of Islamic Conference (OIC).

See also
 Islam in Brazil
 List of mosques in Brazil
 List of mosques in the Americas
 List of the oldest mosques

References 

1929 establishments in Brazil
Brasil
Mosques completed in 1929
Religious buildings and structures in São Paulo